Red Beach may refer to:

 Red Beach, New Zealand, a suburb on the Hibiscus Coast, Auckland, New Zealand
 Red Beach (Panjin), Dawa County, Panjin, Liaoning, China
 Red Beach (Santorini), Greece
 Red Beach Base Area, a complex of former U.S. military bases in Vietnam